The Chief Secretary is the top-most executive official and senior-most civil servant of the state government. The Chief Secretary is the ex-officio head of the state Civil Services Board, the State Secretariat, the state cadre Indian Administrative Service and all civil services under the rules of business of the state government. The Chief Secretary acts as the principal advisor to the chief minister on all matters of state administration.

The Chief Secretary is an officer of the Indian Administrative Service. The Chief Secretary is the senior-most cadre post in the state administration, ranking 23rd on the Indian order of precedence. The Chief Secretary acts as an ex-officio secretary to the state cabinet, therefore called "Secretary to the Cabinet". The status of this post is equal to that of a Secretary to the Government of India.

History
The salary of Chief Secretary of United Provinces of Agra and Oudh, Punjab and Burma was fixed and was same to Joint Secretary to Government of India during the British Raj. As per Warrant or Precedence of 1905, Secretary to Government of India was listed together with Joint Secretary to Government of India and was ranked above the rank of Chief Secretary.

States 
Chief Secretaries are members of the Indian Administrative Service (IAS) who are the administrative head of state governments. A Chief Secretary functions as the central point of interdepartmental coordination at the departmental level and is classified as being in the Apex Grade. Chief Secretary is considered to be 'a linchpin' in the administration. Chief Secretary of the state also acts as the ex-officio Chairman of the State Civil Service Board, which recommends transfer/postings of officers of All India Services and State Civil Services in the state. 

Traditionally, the most senior IAS officer within a state is chosen as the Chief Secretary; however, there are exceptions.

Chief Secretaries are assisted by Additional Chief Secretaries or Special Chief Secretaries, depending on the state, and Principal Secretaries, who are the administrative heads of departments they are assigned to. 

Chief Secretaries are chosen by the state's Chief Minister. State Chief Secretaries are IAS officers generally equivalent in rank to a Secretary to Government of India and are placed 23rd on Indian Order of Precedence.

The post of Chief Secretary of a State Government is equivalent to Vice Chief of the Army Staff/Commanders and officers in the rank of full General and its equivalents in the Indian Armed Forces, and are listed as such in the Order of Precedence.

Union territories 
In the union territories, which are governed by Administrators, Chief Secretaries are absent. In these territories an Adviser to the Administrator is appointed by the Union Government. However, the union territories of Delhi, Jammu and Kashmir and Puducherry, which have been granted partial statehood, do have Chief Secretaries. In Delhi, Jammu and Kashmir and Puducherry, the Chief Minister chooses the Chief Secretary and is appointed by the Lieutenant Governor.

Chief Secretaries and Advisers to the Administrators of Union territories, in general, are junior in rank compared to the Chief Secretaries of the States. The office bearers generally are of the rank Joint Secretary to Government of India and its equivalents. However, in Delhi and Chandigarh, the topmost civil servant is either of the ranks of Secretary to Government of India and its equivalents or Additional Secretary to Government of India and its equivalents.

See also
 List of chief secretaries of Assam
 List of chief secretaries of Maharashtra
 Cabinet Secretary of India
 Secretary to Government of India
 Joint Secretary to Government of India
 Principal Secretary
 Head of Forest Forces
 Director General of Police
 Advocate General
 Indian Forest Service
 Indian Administrative Service
 Indian Police Service

References

Notes

Bibliography 

 
 

Civil Services of India
Indian government officials
State governments of India
Indian Administrative Service officers